Play It as It Lays is the third full-length album by singer-songwriter Patti Scialfa.

Track listing

"The Word", "Town Called Heartbreak" and "Like Any Woman Would" use elements or samples of songs written or recorded by other artists. Used by permissions.

Production

Produced by Steve Jordan, Patti Scialfa, Ron Aniello
Recorded by Dave O'Donnell at Thrill Hill Studios
Mixed by Bob Clearmountain at Mix This!
Additional Engineering by Toby Scott, Eddie Jackson, Trina Shoemaker, Ron Aniello, Roger Moutenot, Brandon Duncan
Mastered by Bob Ludwig at Gateway Mastering

Personnel

The Whack Brothers Rhythm Section
Clifford Carter - keyboards
Steve Jordan - drums, percussion, acoustic guitar 8
Nils Lofgren - pedal steel, dobro slide
Bruce Springsteen - B3 organ 4 and 9, acoustic guitars 1 and 3, electric guitar 5 and 9, harmonica 1
Willie Weeks - bass

Additional musicians:
Ron Aniello - guitar, keyboards
Errol "Crusher" Bennett - percussion 2 and 3
Jeremy Chatzky - bass 4 and 10
Patti Scialfa - acoustic guitar, banjo, Wurlitzer
Mark Stewert - cello 1, 6, 9, guitar 1, banjo 9
Soozie Tyrell - violin 6 and 9
Scott Tibbs - synth strings 9

Background Vocals
Soozie Tyrell - 5, 6, 8 and 9
Lisa Lowell - 5, 6, 8 and 9
Michelle Moore - bridge vocal solo 2, background vocals 3 and 8
Cindy Mizelle - 1, 3 and 8
Curtis King - 1

References

Patti Scialfa albums
2007 albums
Albums produced by Ron Aniello
Columbia Records albums